A borate is any of a range of boron oxyanions, anions containing boron and oxygen, such as orthoborate , metaborate , or tetraborate ; or any salt of such anions, such as sodium metaborate,  and borax . The name also refers to esters of such anions, such as trimethyl borate .

Natural occurrence
Borate ions occur, alone or with other anions, in many borate and borosilicate minerals such as borax, boracite, ulexite (boronatrocalcite) and colemanite. Borates also occur in seawater, where they make an important contribution to the absorption of low frequency sound in seawater.

Borates also occur in plants, including almost all fruits.

Anions
The main borate anions are:
 tetrahydroxyborate , found in sodium tetrahydroxyborate .
 orthoborate , found in trisodium orthoborate 
 perborate , as in sodium perborate 
 metaborate  or its cyclic trimer , found in sodium metaborate 
 diborate , found in magnesium diborate  (suanite),
 triborate , found in calcium aluminum triborate  (johachidolite),
 tetraborate , found in anhydrous borax 
 tetrahydroxytetraborate , found in borax "decahydrate" 
 tetraborate(6-)  found in lithium tetraborate(6-) 
 octaborate  found in disodium octaborate

Preparation

In 1905, Burgess and Holt observed that fusing mixtures of boric oxide  and sodium carbonate  yielded on cooling two crystalline compounds with definite compositions, consistent with anhydrous borax  (which can be written ) and sodium octaborate  (which can be written ).

Structures
These anions may be cyclic or linear in structure, and can further polymerize into infinite chains, layers, and tridimensional frameworks. The terminal (unshared) oxygen atoms in the borate anions may be capped with hydrogen atoms or may carry a negative charge.

The planar  units may be stacked in the crystal lattice so as to have π-conjugated molecular orbitals, which often results in useful optical properties such as strong harmonics generation, birefringence, and UV transmission.

Other anions contain cycles; for instance,  and  contain the cyclic  ion, consisting of a six-membered ring of alternating boron and oxygen atoms with one extra oxygen atom attached to each boron atom.

The thermal expansion of crystalline borates is dominated by the fact that  and  polyhedra and rigid groups consisting of these polyhedra practically do not change their configuration and size upon heating, but sometimes rotate like hinges, which results in greatly anisotropic thermal expansion including linear negative expansion.

Reactions

Aqueous solution

In aqueous solution, boric acid  can act as a weak Brønsted acid, that is, a proton donor, with pKa ~ 9. However, it more often acts as a Lewis acid, accepting an electron pair from a hydroxyl ion produced by the water autoprotolysis:

  + 2    +  (pK = 8.98)

This reaction is very fast, with characteristic time less than 10 μs. Polymeric boron oxoanions are formed in aqueous solution of boric acid at pH 7–10 if the boron concentration is higher than about 0.025 mol/L. The best known of these is the tetraborate ion , found in the mineral borax:

4  + 2    + 7 

Other anions observed in solution are triborate(1−) and pentaborate(1−), in equilibrium with boric acid and tetrahydroxyborate according to the following overall reactions:

 2 +    + 3 (fast, pK = —1.92)

 4 +    + 6 (slow, pK = —2.05)

These ions, similarly to the complexed borates mentioned above, are more acidic than boric acid itself. As a result of this, the pH of a concentrated polyborate solution will increase more than expected when diluted with water.

Borate salts
A number of metal borates are known. They can be obtained by treating boric acid or boron oxides with metal oxides.

Mixed anion salts
Some chemicals contain another anion in addition to borate. These include borate chlorides, borate carbonates, borate nitrates, borate sulfates, borate phosphates.

Complex oxyanions containing boron
More complex anions can be formed by condensing borate triangles or tetrahedra with other oxyanions to yield materials such as borosulfates, boroselenates, borotellurates, boroantimonates, borophosphates, or boroselenites.

Borosilicate glass, also known as pyrex, can be viewed as a silicate in which some [SiO4]4− units are replaced by [BO4]5− centers, together with additional cations to compensate for the difference in valence states of Si(IV) and B(III). Because this substitution leads to imperfections, the material is slow to crystallise and forms a glass with low coefficient of thermal expansion, thus resistant to cracking when heated, unlike soda glass.

Uses

Common borate salts include sodium metaborate (NaBO2) and borax. Borax is soluble in water, so mineral deposits only occur in places with very low rainfall. Extensive deposits were found in Death Valley and shipped with twenty-mule teams from 1883 to 1889. In 1925, deposits were found at Boron, California on the edge of the Mojave Desert. The Atacama Desert in Chile also contains mineable borate concentrations.

Lithium metaborate, lithium tetraborate, or a mixture of both, can be used in borate fusion sample preparation of various samples for analysis by XRF, AAS, ICP-OES and ICP-MS. Borate fusion and energy dispersive X-ray fluorescence spectrometry with polarized excitation have been used in the analysis of contaminated soils.

Disodium octaborate tetrahydrate  (commonly abbreviated DOT) is used as a wood preservative or fungicide. Zinc borate is used as a flame retardant.

Some borates with large anions and multiple cations, like  and  have been considered for applications in nonlinear optics.

Borate esters
Borate esters are organic compounds, which are conveniently prepared by the stoichiometric condensation reaction of boric acid with alcohols (or their chalcogen analogs).

Thin films 
Metal borate thin films have been grown by a variety of techniques, including liquid-phase epitaxy (e.g. FeBO3, β‐BaB2O4), electron-beam evaporation (e.g. CrBO3, β‐BaB2O4), pulsed laser deposition (e.g. β‐BaB2O4,  Eu(BO2)3), and atomic layer deposition (ALD). Growth by ALD was achieved using precursors composed of the tris(pyrazolyl)borate ligand and either ozone or water as the oxidant to deposit CaB2O4, SrB2O4, BaB2O4, Mn3(BO3)2, and CoB2O4 films.

Physiology
Borate anions are largely in the form of the undissociated acid in aqueous solution at physiological pH. No further metabolism occurs in either animals or plants. In animals, boric acid/borate salts are essentially completely absorbed following oral ingestion. Absorption occurs via inhalation, although quantitative data are unavailable. Limited data indicate that boric acid/salts are not absorbed through intact skin to any significant extent, although absorption occurs through skin that is severely abraded. It distributes throughout the body and is not retained in tissues, except for bone, and is rapidly excreted in the urine.

See also

 Nanochannel glass materials
 Porous glass
 Vycor glass
 Silly Putty
 Slime (toy)
 Tris(2,2,2-trifluoroethyl) borate

References

External links

 Suanite at webmineral
 Johachidolite at webmineral
 Non-CCA Wood Preservatives: Guide to Selected Resources - National Pesticide Information Center

Borate minerals
 
Industrial minerals
Inorganic compounds
Neutron poisons
Oxyanions
Pesticides
Preservatives
Rheology
Testicular toxicants